James Johnstone (1719 – c. 1791), also known as Chevalier de Johnstone or Johnstone de Moffatt, was the son of an Edinburgh merchant. He escaped to France after participating in the 1745 Rising; in 1750, he was commissioned in the colonial army and served in French North America.

His military career was undistinguished and he remained a Lieutenant after ten years of service. Following the loss of Quebec in 1760, he returned to France and left the army. There are few details on his later life and he is thought to have died sometime after 1791.

He is best remembered for his Memoirs of the rebellion in 1745 and 1746, first published in 1820.

Life

James Johnstone was born 25 July 1719, only son of Jeremy Boone Johnstone, an Edinburgh merchant; his mother was a distant relative of Lady Jane (or Jean) Douglas (ca 1698-1753), later the centre of a famous inheritance case known as the Douglas Cause.

He had two sisters; the elder, Cecilia (ca 1715-1746), married John Rollo (1708-1783), later 6th Lord Rollo. His other sister Jean married Hugh Leslie of Dalkeith and their great-grandson purchased Johnstone's manuscripts in 1870.

There is no record of Johnstone ever marrying or having children.

Career

There are few details of Johnstone's early life, apart from those given in his autobiography but he admits to being a poor student, 'given to dissipation and extravagance.' He had a difficult relationship with his father, but was indulged by his mother and Lady Jane, who lent him money.

In 1738, he persuaded his father to send him to Saint Petersburg, where he stayed with his mother's uncle, James Hewitt, an expatriate Scot and merchant. Another uncle, Gustav Otto Douglas (1687-1771), was a Russian general, who was born in Sweden, then changed sides after being captured at Poltava in 1709. Douglas arranged a commission for Johnstone in the Russian military but his father threatened to disinherit him if he accepted and after a period in London, he returned to Edinburgh in 1740.

His sister's marriage into the Rollo family connected Johnstone to the small circle of Jacobite gentry in Perthshire that supplied over 20% of the rebel army in the 1745 Rising. Robert, 4th Lord Rollo (1679-1758) participated in the 1715 Rising, although his son Andrew Rollo (1703-1765) served with the British army in Flanders during the War of the Austrian Succession.

Johnstone joined the Jacobites when they reached Perth in early September 1745 and was appointed captain in the Duke of Perth's regiment. Although his claim to have been aide-de-camp to Lord George Murray cannot be verified, he was present throughout the campaign, including the invasion of England. Perth ordered him to join the garrison left at Carlisle in December but he refused, saying he 'would never be a victim by choice.' At Culloden in April 1746, he allegedly took part in the attack on the government lines, before escaping by taking someone else's horse.

He made his way to Ruthven Barracks along with around 1,500 other survivors; on 20 April, Charles ordered them to disperse until he returned from France with additional support. Johnstone accompanied Lord Ogilvy to Clova in Angus, then spent several weeks hiding in the Highlands, before reaching Edinburgh, where his old friend Lady Jane Douglas helped him escape to London. He records watching members of the Jacobite Manchester Regiment being taken to Kennington Common for their execution on 30 July 1746. Disguised as one of Lady Jane's servants, he eventually arrived in the Dutch city of The Hague, where they parted. 

Although he had originally intended to return to Russia, Johnstone stayed in Paris until Prince Charles was expelled from France after the 1748 Treaty of Aix-la-Chapelle. In 1750, a connection to the Marquis de Puisieulx, then French Foreign Minister led to his appointment as ensign in the Compagnies Franches de la Marine. These were regular troops raised for service in French North America and Johnstone was posted to Île-Royale, Nova Scotia. A recurring theme of his Memoirs are complaints of unfair treatment and he considered this rank an insult; however, he arrived in Louisbourg and was promoted Lieutenant in 1754.

The colonial dispute between Britain and France or the French and Indian War began in 1754, two years before the better known global conflict called the Seven Years' War. When the British captured Louisbourg in June 1758, Johnstone was stationed on Prince Edward Island and escaped to Quebec. He served under Montcalm, commander at Quebec until his death on 13 September in the Battle of the Plains of Abraham; despite being recognised by the British as a Scot, he was allowed to return to France in October 1760.

The loss of North America resulted in the disbandment of the Compagnies; Johnstone was paid a small pension and appointed to the Order of Saint Louis in 1762. Although the Memoirs often refer to his preference for a military life, his career was undistinguished and it ended here. There are few details of his life thereafter; he apparently visited Scotland in 1779 but seems to have had little contact with his family. The parlous state of French government finances resulted in his pension being reduced in the 1770s; it was stopped completely following the 1789 French Revolution but later restored.

While it is generally agreed he died in Paris, the date is uncertain; the Oxford Dictionary of National Biography suggests circa 1800. There is no record of him after 1791, which is used by the Dictionary of Canadian Biography and other sources.

Johnstone reportedly deposited his manuscripts in the Scots College, Paris, including Memoirs of the rebellion in 1745-46, translated into English and published in 1822. While full of complaints about the injustice of the world and often extremely self-centred, they are lively and include the occasional flash of insight. Like many, he disliked Prince Charles but although an admirer of Lord George Murray, he recorded his talents were offset by a quick temper, arrogance and inability to take advice.

Other works dealing with his time in Canada were printed in Quebec in 1887; The Campaign of 1760 in Canada and A dialogue in Hades: a parallel of military errors, of which the French and English armies were guilty, during the campaign of 1759, in Canada.

References

Sources
 
 
 
 McCann, Jean E (1963) The Organisation of the Jacobite Army (PHD thesis) Edinburgh University, OCLC 646764870

External links
 
 
 
 L’Encyclopédie de l’histoire du Québec / The Quebec History Encyclopedia - "James Chevalier de Johnstone"
 
 “Memoirs of the rebellion in 1745 and 1746″ – media and intelligence in James Johnstone’s autobiography

1719 births
1791 deaths
Order of Saint Louis recipients
Scottish Jacobites
Military personnel from Edinburgh
Jacobite military personnel of the Jacobite rising of 1745
People of New France
British people of the French and Indian War
French military personnel of the Seven Years' War